A71 or A-71 may refer to:
 A71 road in Afghanistan
 A71 motorway (France)
 A71 road (Scotland)
 Benoni Defense, in the Encyclopaedia of Chess Openings
 Bundesautobahn 71, a German motorway also called A 71
 Mitchell Highway, a road in Queensland
 Samsung Galaxy A71, smartphone released in 2019
 "A71", a song by New Jersey band Lorna Shore